John P. McDonough (May 24, 1928 – November 17, 2021) was an American Air Force officer who served as Chief of Chaplains of the United States Air Force.

Early life and education
Born in Boston, Massachusetts in 1928, McDonough was an ordained Catholic priest. He was a graduate of Saint John's Seminary.

Career
McDonough joined the United States Air Force in 1963 and was stationed at Eglin Air Force Base.

In 1982, McDonough became Command Chaplain at Headquarters, United States Air Forces in Europe. From there, he served as Command Chaplain at Headquarters, Tactical Air Command from 1984 until 1985, when he became Deputy Chief of Chaplains of the United States Air Force. He was promoted to Chief of Chaplains with the rank of major general in 1988 and held the position until his retirement in 1991.

Awards he received include the Legion of Merit, the Meritorious Service Medal with oak leaf cluster, the Air Force Commendation Medal with oak leaf cluster, the Army Commendation Medal and the Outstanding Unit Award.

After his military retirement in 1991, Msgr. McDonough was named the 12th Pastor of St. John the Baptist Parish in Peabody, Massachusetts.

Personal life
McDonough died in Boston on November 17, 2021, at the age of 93.

References

1928 births
2021 deaths
Clergy from Boston
United States Air Force generals
Chiefs of Chaplains of the United States Air Force
American Roman Catholic priests
Recipients of the Legion of Merit
Saint John's Seminary (Massachusetts) alumni